Irmgard Brendenal-Böhmer (née Brendenal) is a retired East German rower who won two European titles in the eights event in 1964 and 1966. Her husband Joachim Böhmer was also a competitive rower.

References

Year of birth missing (living people)
Living people
East German female rowers
European Rowing Championships medalists